Sathyan Sivakumar and known mononymously as Sathyan, is an Indian actor and comedian who works in Tamil cinema. He is the only son of veteran producer, Madhampatty Sivakumar. Making debut as a junior artist in the movie Poovum Puyalum and as lead in Ilaiyavan, he subsequently has been appearing mainly in supporting and comedic roles in over sixty Tamil films.

Early life
Sathyan was born to film producer Mathampatti Sivakumar. Actor Sathyaraj is his uncle, while Sibiraj is his cousin. Sathyan studied at PSG College of Arts and Science in Coimbatore. After graduating with a BBM degree, he entered the film industry by playing the lead role in the Ilaiyaraaja musical Ilaiyavan, which was produced by his father himself. He then acted in Kanna Unnai Thedukiren, both of these films which featured him in lead role failed at box-office and Sathyan chose to portray comedy roles. He later appeared in a pivotal role in Maayavi (2005), where he worked alongside Suriya and Jyothika.

After a series of small supporting roles, he received another break portraying the role of Srivatsan in Shankar's Nanban (2012) and then featured alongside Vijay again in a pivotal role in A R Murugadoss's Thuppakki. He featured as one of the four main leads in boy-adventure films Onbadhule Guru (2013) and Naveena Saraswathi Sabatham (2013), while also starring in the commercially successful romantic comedy, Raja Rani (2013).

Filmography
Actor

Dubbing artist

References

External links
 

Year of birth missing (living people)
Place of birth missing (living people)
Living people
Indian male film actors
Tamil male actors
Tamil comedians
Indian male comedians
People from Coimbatore district
Male actors from Tamil Nadu
Male actors in Tamil cinema